The history of Società Sportiva Juve Stabia officially started in 2002, following the bankruptcy in 2001 of S.S. Juventus Stabia, based in Castellammare di Stabia, Campania. The first incarnation of the club was founded in 1907 as Stabia Sporting Club and was refounded in 1933 as F.C. Stabiese. Since 1953 Juventus Stabia, the second club of the city is become the main team; in 2002 the new company after the bankruptcy of the year before has acquired the sports title of Comprensorio Nola.

Currently, Juve Stabia plays in Serie B where it has already played in the 1951–52 season as A.C. Stabia.

The nickname of the team is Le vespe (The Wasps).

From 1907 to 1953

From Stabia S.C. to F.C. Stabiese 
On 19 March 1907 Weiss, the Romano brothers and Pauzano, founded the club Stabia Sporting Club. Originally it was a sporting club that participated in fencing, cycling, running, swimming and rowing.

By 1911, the footballing section of the club first started activity. The first officially reported game took place on 12 February 1911 against a team from Torre Annunziata, which is around four miles away. The match itself took place on the field of "le Montagnelle" near Boscotrecase, it finished 3–0 to Stabia. This was reported in the Neapolitan daily paper "Il Mattino".

Stabia played local games at this point, a notable 0–0 draw was achieved against the more famous Naples on 1 February 1914, the squad that day included; Dell’Aquila, Schettino, Celoro, De Rosa, Laugeri (captain), Amato, Weiss, Pauzano, Romano I°, Romano II° and Cappa. Around this period Stabia also played a match against the crew of English ship HMS Black Prince, with the English winning 11–1.

Stabia enters the league
During 1916, Stabia entered into league competitions for the first time. They were entered into the old Terza Category (today's equivalent is Serie C), Stabia reached the semi-finals before losing 5–1 to Campanian rivals Savoia. Play was halted for World War I, but after it in 1919 the club was refounded thanks largely to Vincenzo Bonifacio. The first game after refounding was a friendly against a team of English sailors who called themselves War Lion, Stabia were victorious, winning the game 6–0. In Castellammare di Stabia a club was founded during August 1919, called Sport Club War, this was merged with Stabia S.C. by 1920.

Stabia were entered into the Prima Categoria Campania, here they competed against the top clubs from the Campania region. The club finished 6th out of seven clubs, the most memorable result of which was a 4–0 victory away against Salernitana. They returned the following season in 1922–23, where the Campania section was down to five teams; they finished 3rd in their region, behind Savoia and Internaples, thus meaning they did not go any further in the competition that season.

Around this period Scarselli, Coppola and Pausano obtained the land for Stabia where the Stadio Romeo Menti would much later be built. After playing at the top level of the Italian Championship, they spent some time in the Seconda Categoria and then in 1929 they dropped down to the third level of Italian football.

The club in 1930 was renamed F.C. Stabiese and in 1933 it has declared bankrupt.

On 1933 A.C. Stabia
Stabia was refounded as A.C. Stabia by Salvatore Russo in 1933.

The 1936–37 season was a successful one for the club, they went through the season undefeated and won the Prima Divisione, the Coppa di Natale and the Direttoriwhich waso Regionale; the latter achieved with a 5–1 victory over Casertana. Around this period, Stabia joined the organization Ludi Fascisti Stabiesi, the president was Amilcare Sciarretta, a civil employee of the Banca d'Italia.

In the 1951–52 season it played in Serie B.

In 1953 it was declared bankrupt.

From 1953 to 2001

S.S. Juventus Stabia, a new main team 

In 1953 the second club of the town Società Sportiva Juventus Stabia, founded in 1945 becomes so the main team of Castellamare di Stabia and inherits the sporting tradition of the former club.

The Juventus part of the name is taken from the famous Turin club Juventus, who were particularly successful during the early part of the 1930s; the word is Latin for youth.

In 1996 the club was renamed AC Juve Stabia.

The club was declared bankrupt in 2001.

The football in Castellammare di Stabia now

From Comprensorio Stabia to S.S. Juve Stabia 
On 2002 the club was refounded as Comprensorio Stabia renamed in 2003 with the current name. It was promoted to Serie C2 and in Serie C1.

On 2008 the football club passes into the hands of Francesco Giglio and Franco Manniello. They bring in three years the Juve Stabia playing in Serie B after 59 years, and also to win the Coppa Italia Lega Pro, 2010–11 edition.

In 2011–12 Juve Stabia is ranked in 9th place of the Serie B, thanks to the excellent performance of Sau, Cazzola, Erpen and many others. It is saved the following year with the 16th place of the Serie B.

References

External links
Official site

S.S. Juve Stabia
Juve Stabia